Tekhnologichesky Institut (English: Technology Institute) is a cross-platform interchange station of the Saint Petersburg Metro.  The station consists of two halls, both serving the Kirovsko-Vyborgskaya Line and Moskovsko-Petrogradskaya Line trains. The first hall serves the southbound trains, while the second hall serves the northbound ones.

History

The first hall was opened on November 15, 1955, as part of the first metro line between Avtovo and Ploshchad Vosstaniya.  The name comes from the fact that the surface vestibule is located immediately next to Saint Petersburg State Institute of Technology.  The architects were A. M. Sokolov and A. K. Andreyev (surface vestibule and underground hall).  The basic theme of the station is the achievements of Russian and Soviet science.  The basic material for decorating the underground hall is Ural marble.  On the columns are 24 bas reliefs with portraits of well-known Soviet scientists.  On the platform walls are placed decorative grilles.

This deep column station existed for several years as an ordinary station of the Kirovsko-Vyborgskaya Line, with trains traveling in both directions.  But on April 29, 1961, the second hall was opened, as a part of the second line of the Saint Petersburg Metro.  This became the first cross-platform facility in the USSR, coming into full operation on November 1, 1963.

The second hall, in contrast to the first, was built in the functional style, called for by Nikita Khrushchev's program of total economy.  The architects A. I. Pribulskiy, A. Ya. Macheret, and V. V. Gankevich designed an almost white wall with decorative texts on the marble columns, chronicling the accomplishments of Soviet science and technology, which were continually added to over time.

Initially, the second hall had no exit to the surface and was connected to the first by a central passage, during the construction of which the bas reliefs of Friedrich Engels and Joseph Stalin were removed.  Only in 1980 did the architects A. S. Getskin, A. V. Kvyatovsky, and I. E. Sergeyev build a second inclined passage and join the vestibule of the first hall with the second.

Exits from both halls are located at the northern end, with three escalators each.

On April 3, 2017, a suicide bomber exploded on a train in Moskovsko-Petrogradskaya line between Sennaya Ploshchad and  Tekhnologichesky Institut stations, killing at least 14 people and injuring dozens.

References

Saint Petersburg Metro stations
Railway stations in Russia opened in 1955
Railway stations located underground in Russia
Cultural heritage monuments of regional significance in Saint Petersburg